Marcus Didius Julianus (29 January 133 or 137 – 2 June 193) was Roman emperor from March to June 193, during the Year of the Five Emperors. Julianus had a promising political career, governing several provinces, including Dalmatia and Germania Inferior, and defeated the Chauci and Chatti, two invading Germanic tribes. He was even appointed to the consulship in 175 along with Pertinax as a reward, before being demoted by Commodus. After this demotion, his early, promising political career languished.

Julianus ascended the throne after buying it from the Praetorian Guard, who had assassinated his predecessor Pertinax. A civil war ensued in which three rival generals laid claim to the imperial throne. Septimius Severus, commander of the legions in Pannonia and the nearest of the generals to Rome, marched on the capital, gathering support along the way and routing cohorts of the Praetorian Guard Julianus sent to meet him. Abandoned by the Senate and the Praetorian Guard, Julianus was killed by a soldier in the palace and succeeded by Severus.

Early life 

Julianus was born to Quintus Petronius Didius Severus and Aemilia Clara. His father came from a prominent family in Mediolanum, modern-day Milan, and his mother was a North African woman of Roman descent, from a family of consular rank. His brothers were Didius Proculus and Didius Nummius Albinus. His date of birth was 29 January, the year given as 133 by Cassius Dio and 137 by the Historia Augusta. Didius Julianus was raised by Domitia Calvilla, mother of the emperor Marcus Aurelius. With Domitia's help, he was appointed at a very early age to the vigintivirate, the first step towards public distinction. He married a Roman woman named Manlia Scantilla, and sometime around 153, she bore him a daughter, Didia Clara, their only child.

Imperial service 

In succession Julianus held the offices of quaestor and aedile, and then, around 162, was named as praetor. He was nominated to the command of the Legio XXII Primigenia in Mogontiacum (now Mainz). In 170, he became praefectus of Gallia Belgica and served for five years. After repelling an invasion by the Chauci, a tribe dwelling in the drainage basin of the river Scheldt, the northwestern coastal area of present-day Germany, he was raised to the consulship in 175 along with Pertinax. He further distinguished himself in a campaign against the Chatti, governed Dalmatia and Germania Inferior.  He was then made prefect, charged with distributing money to the poor of Italy. Modern historians generally consider this a demotion for political reasons, as Commodus, the Roman Emperor at the time, feared Julianus' growing power. It was around this time that he was charged with having conspired against the life of Commodus, but the jury acquitted him and instead punished his accuser. Afterwards, he governed Bithynia and succeeded Pertinax as the proconsul of North Africa.

Emperor

Rise to power 

After the murder of Pertinax on 28 March 193, the Praetorian guard announced that the throne was to be sold to the man who would pay the highest price. Titus Flavius Claudius Sulpicianus, prefect of Rome and Pertinax's father-in-law, who was in the Praetorian camp ostensibly to calm the troops, began making offers for the throne. Meanwhile, Julianus also arrived at the camp, and since his entrance was barred, shouted out offers to the guard. After hours of bidding, Sulpicianus promised 20,000 sesterces to every soldier; Julianus, fearing that Sulpicianus would gain the throne, then offered 25,000. The guards closed with the offer of Julianus, threw open the gates, and proclaimed him emperor. Threatened by the military, the Senate also declared him emperor. His wife and his daughter both received the title Augusta.

Reign and opposition 

Upon his accession, Julianus immediately reversed Pertinax's monetary reforms by devaluing the Roman currency to near pre-Pertinax levels. Because Julianus bought his position rather than acquiring it conventionally through succession or conquest, he was a deeply unpopular emperor. When Julianus appeared in public, he frequently was greeted with groans and shouts of “robber and parricide." Once, a mob even obstructed his progress to the Capitol by pelting him with large stones. When news of the public anger in Rome spread across the Empire, three influential generals, Pescennius Niger in Syria, Septimius Severus in Pannonia, and Clodius Albinus in Britain, each able to muster three legions, rebelled. They refused to accept Julianus' authority as emperor and instead declared themselves emperor. Julianus declared Severus a public enemy because he was the nearest of the three to Rome, making him the most dangerous foe. Julianus sent senators to persuade Severus' legionaries to abandon him, a new general was nominated to replace him, and a centurion dispatched to take Severus' life.

The Praetorian Guard had rarely fought in field battles, so Julianus marched them into the Campus Martius and drilled the guard in the construction of fortifications and field works. Despite this training, the Praetorian Guard was still undertrained compared to the field legionaries of Severus. Severus first secured the support of Albinus, declaring him Caesar, and then seized Ravenna and its fleet. Severus killed Tullius Crispinus, the Praetorian prefect, who was sent to negotiate with Severus and slow his march on Rome, and won over to his cause the ambassadors sent to turn his troops. Cassius Dio maintained that the Praetorian Guard tried to fight back, but were crushed, while modern historians believe that the Praetorian Guard simply abandoned Julianus, deserting en masse.

Julianus attempted to negotiate with Severus, offering to share the empire with his rival, but Severus ignored these overtures and pressed forward. As he marched, more and more cities in Italy supported his claim to the throne. The remnants of the Praetorian Guard received pardons from Severus in exchange for surrendering the actual murderers of Pertinax. After seizing the ringleaders and killing them, the soldiers reported what they had done to Marcus Silius Messala, the consul, who summoned the senate to inform them of the proceedings. The Senate passed a motion proclaiming Severus emperor, awarded divine honours to Pertinax, and sentenced Julianus to death. Julianus was deserted by all except one of the prefects and his son-in-law, Cornelius Repentinus.

Death 

Julianus was killed in the palace by a soldier on 2 June 193 AD, after a mere 66 days of ruling.  According to the contemporary Roman historian Cassius Dio, Julianus' last words were: “But what evil have I done? Whom have I killed?” His body was given to his wife and daughter, who buried it in his great-grandfather's tomb by the fifth milestone on the Via Labicana. The Senate passed a damnatio memoriae motion to condemn Julianus and his legacy. Severus dismissed the Praetorian Guard and executed the soldiers who had killed Pertinax, the previous emperor.

Legacy 

Julianus repelled invasions by the Chatti and the Chauci, both of which helped protect Rome's border provinces. In the long run, the two tribes he repelled were but the harbingers of far larger Germanic migrations that would only truly finish in the sixth century AD.From arguably the reign of M. Aurelius, Rome would be constantly subject to incursions from the descendants of these tribes, see Crisis of the Third Century and Migration Period. As emperor, Didius Julianus was unable to pass any major policy reforms in his short reign other than currency devaluation. While the currency devaluation was comparatively minor, he restarted the trend of devaluing the Roman currency which had abated under Pertinax's reign. The trend he started, which would continue under the Severan dynasty on a far larger scale, destroyed confidence in Rome's currency, led to rampant hyperinflation, and caused widespread economic upheaval. Moreover, his blatant purchase of the throne shattered any illusions of normalcy in the Roman Empire.

Popular culture 

In the movie The Fall of The Roman Empire, Julianus is played by Eric Porter and depicted as a scheming henchman of Commodus. At the end of the movie, Julianus and Pescennius Niger, played by Douglas Wilmer, another crony of Commodus, compete against each other in the auction for the throne of Rome.

References

Citations

Works cited 

 Dio Cassius, Roman History, Epitome of Book LXXIV, 11–17
 
 Historia Augusta, Didius Julianus
 Herodian, Roman History, ii.6–13

External links

 Coinage of Didius Julianus
 Biography at Roman-emperors.org
 Livius.org: Didius Julianus 

130s births
193 deaths
2nd-century executions
2nd-century murdered monarchs
2nd-century Roman emperors
Julianus
Executed Roman emperors
History of auctions
Imperial Roman consuls
Imperial Roman praetors
Military personnel from Milan
People executed by the Roman Empire
Roman emperors to suffer posthumous denigration or damnatio memoriae
Roman governors of Africa
Roman governors of Bithynia and Pontus
Roman governors of Dalmatia
Roman governors of Gallia Belgica
Roman governors of Germania Inferior
Year of birth uncertain